The Anglo-French War was a major medieval conflict which pitted the Kingdom of France against the Kingdom of England and various other states. It was fought in an attempt to curb the rising power of King Philip II of France and regain the Angevin continental possessions King John of England lost to him a decade earlier. It is widely regarded as the very first anti-French coalition war and came to an end at the decisive Battle of Bouvines, where Philip defeated England and its allies.

The Duchy of Normandy, once a site of conflict between Richard I of England and Philip II, grew to be one of the hot spots of medieval Anglo-French wars as the King of England had to defend a continental holding so close to Paris. In 1202, Philip II launched an invasion of Normandy, culminating in the six month-long Siege of Château Gaillard, which led to the conquest of the duchy and of neighbouring territories.

In 1214, when Pope Innocent III assembled an alliance of states against France, John registered in. The allies met Philip near Bouvines and were soundly defeated. The French victory resulted in the conquest of Flanders and put an end to further attempts from John to regain his lost territories.

This conflict was an episode of a century long struggle between the House of Capet and the House of Plantagenet over the Angevin domains in France, which started with Henry II's accession to the English throne in 1154 and his rivalry with Louis VII, and ended with Louis IX's triumph over Henry III at the Battle of Taillebourg in 1242.

Aftermath 
After the disastrous military campaigns in France and the loss of much of the Angevin domains, King John became increasingly unpopular and a civil war erupted in England as lords challenged him. Some of the rebellious barons, faced with an uncompromising king, turned to Prince Louis, son and heir apparent of King Philip and grandson-in-law of King Henry II of England. Despite discouragement from his father and Pope Innocent III, Louis sailed to England with an army on 14 June 1216, captured Winchester and soon controlled over half of the English kingdom. But just when it seemed like England was about to be his, King John's sudden death in October caused the rebellious barons to desert Louis in favour of John's nine-year-old son, Henry III.

With William Marshall acting as regent, a call for the English "to defend our land" against the French led to a reversal of fortunes on the battlefield. After his army was beaten at Lincoln on 20 May 1217 and a fleet led by Eustace the Monk, attempting to bring French reinforcements, was defeated off the coast of Sandwich on 24 August, Louis was forced to make peace on English terms.

The principal provisions of the Treaty of Lambeth were an amnesty for English rebels, Louis to undertake not to attack England again, and 10,000 marks to be given to Louis. The effect of the treaty was that Louis agreed he had never been the legitimate King of England.

References

Bibliography 
 
 

Anglo-French wars
Wars involving England
Wars involving France
Battles involving Flanders
History of Nord (French department)
Conflicts in 1213
Conflicts in 1214
1210s in France
1213 in England
1214 in England
Robin Hood
England–France relations
13th-century military history of the Kingdom of England
Philip II of France